is a professional Japanese baseball player. He plays outfielder for the Hiroshima Toyo Carp.

External links

 NPB.com

1981 births
Living people
Baseball people from Saga Prefecture
Japanese baseball players
Nippon Professional Baseball outfielders
Orix BlueWave players
Orix Buffaloes players
Hiroshima Toyo Carp players
Japanese baseball coaches
Nippon Professional Baseball coaches